Haroon Lorgat (born 26 May 1960) is a South African businessman and chartered accountant. He has served as CEO of the International Cricket Council and Cricket South Africa.

Personal life and education
Lorgat is of Indian descent, his family originating from a small village called Manekpore, Rethvania in the western state of Gujarat. Lorgat was raised and schooled in Port Elizabeth. He graduated from Rhodes University with a B.Com. In 1985 he completed training with a Big 4 firm and qualified as a Chartered Accountant. After working at IBM for a year he started his own professional practice in Johannesburg and Cape Town which, through a series of strategic mergers, finally integrated with Ernst & Young in 2002. Prior to his appointment at the ICC, Lorgat was Chief Executive of private equity investment firm Kapela Investment Holdings (based in Cape Town and Johannesburg) that he founded in December 2006. He has been married to Farah Ebrahim since 10 February 1985 and they have two children, Mohamed Zaheer and Naseera.

Career
Lorgat played provincial cricket for Eastern Province and Transvaal in the Howa Bowl. He played 76 first class matches  between 1974/75 and 1990/91. He was an allrounder and topped the batting averages in the 1985/86 season.

Cricket administration
Lorgat was formerly a senior partner at EY before being appointed chief executive of the International Cricket Council in April 2008 succeeding Malcolm Speed.  Haroon Lorgat stepped down in June 2012. Lorgat was later roped in to join firstly Sri Lanka Cricket (SLC) and then the Pakistan Cricket Board as a consultant. He was appointed in July 2013 as chief executive of Cricket South Africa (CSA) and has been lauded for restoring the reputation of cricket and for his excellent work in CSA being recognised as the best run sporting federation in South Africa. In 2016 he was recognised for his leadership by being awarded the SA Sports Industries inaugural Business Leadership award.

In September 2017, Lorgat and CSA "mutually agreed to part ways with immediate effect" because of a "breakdown" in their relationship. Before that Lorgat was supposed to continue as CEO until 2019, however, differences with CSA arose in the handling of the inaugural T20 Global League.

In October 2020, Lorgat joins T10 Sports Management one of the promoters of the Abu Dhabi T10 League as Director for Strategy and Development to spearhead growth and development of the ten-over format cricket worldwide.

References

External links 
 
 

South African cricket administrators
South African people of Indian descent
South African people of Gujarati descent
South African Muslims
South African cricketers
Gauteng cricketers
Eastern Province cricketers
1960 births
Living people